Kelvin Skerrett (born 22 May 1966) is an English former professional rugby league footballer who played in the 1980s and 1990s, and coached in the 2000s.

Background
Skerrett was born in Middleton, Leeds, West Riding of Yorkshire, England.

Playing career
Skerrett was a Wales international and played at the 1995 Rugby League World Cup. He played for Wigan from 1990 to 1996, a successful period for that team, making 176 appearances (including 21 substitute appearances) and scoring 21 tries, and was named among BBC sports commentator Ray French's best Wigan XIII.
He was selected to go on the 1992 Great Britain Lions tour of Australia and New Zealand. During the 1992–93 Rugby Football League season he played from the bench in Great Britain's loss to Australia in the World Cup Final at Wembley.

Skerrett played left- in Bradford Northern's 12–12 draw with Castleford in the 1987 Yorkshire Cup Final during the 1987–88 season at Headingley, Leeds on Saturday 17 October 1987, played left- in the 11–2 victory over Castleford in the 1987 Yorkshire Cup Final replay during the 1987–88 season at Elland Road, Leeds on Saturday 31 October 1987, played left- in the 20–14 victory over Featherstone Rovers in the 1989 Yorkshire Cup Final during the 1989–90 season at Headingley, Leeds on Sunday 5 November 1989, and played left- in Wigan's 5–4 victory over St. Helens in the 1992 Lancashire Cup Final during the 1992–93 season at Knowsley Road, St. Helens on Sunday 18 October 1992.

Skerrett played left- in Wigan's 2–33 defeat by Castleford in the 1993–94 Regal Trophy Final during the 1993–94 season at Elland Road, Leeds on Saturday 22 January 1994, and played left- in the 40–10 victory over Warrington in the 1994–95 Regal Trophy Final during the 1994–95 season at Alfred McAlpine Stadium, Huddersfield on Saturday 28 January 1995.

Post playing
After his playing career ended, Skerrett coached at British Amateur Rugby League Association (BARLA) Oulton Raiders ARLFC. He was later appointed Head Coach of new amateur rugby league club Methley Royals in 2009, to stand in for Tony Handforth, who had suffered a stroke. Handforth later returned to take back his job.

References

External links
!Great Britain Statistics at englandrl.co.uk (statistics currently missing due to not having appeared for both Great Britain, and England)*(archived by web.archive.org) World Cup 1995 details

1966 births
Living people
Bradford Bulls players
English rugby league coaches
English rugby league players
Great Britain national rugby league team players
Halifax R.L.F.C. players
Hunslet R.L.F.C. players
Rugby league players from Leeds
Rugby league props
Rugby league second-rows
Wales national rugby league team captains
Wales national rugby league team players
Western Suburbs Magpies players
Wigan Warriors players